Shurentheran Murugesan (born 30 March 1956) is a Malaysian field hockey player. He competed in the men's tournament at the 1984 Summer Olympics.

References

External links
 

1956 births
Living people
Malaysian people of Tamil descent
Malaysian sportspeople of Indian descent
Malaysian male field hockey players
Olympic field hockey players of Malaysia
Field hockey players at the 1984 Summer Olympics
Place of birth missing (living people)
Asian Games medalists in field hockey
Asian Games bronze medalists for Malaysia
Medalists at the 1982 Asian Games
Field hockey players at the 1982 Asian Games